Dietrich Hogemann (1852–1917) was Commodore of the Norddeutscher Lloyd fleet of ocean liners. He retired in May 1913 after 44 years at sea. He died in 1917 in Bremen, Germany.

Awards
 Prussian Red Eagle and the Crown
 Oldenburg Knights Cross
 Swedish Wassermann Order
 Crown of Italy

References

1852 births
1917 deaths
Norddeutscher Lloyd